Ignacy Dybała (25 January 1926 – 7 September 2016) was a Polish footballer. He played in one match for the Poland national football team in 1950.

References

External links
 

1926 births
2016 deaths
Polish footballers
Poland international footballers
Place of birth missing
Association football defenders